Ancylonotus is a monotypic beetle genus in the family Cerambycidae described by Pierre François Marie Auguste Dejean in 1835. Its only species, Ancylonotus tribulus, was described by Johan Christian Fabricius in 1775.

References

Ancylonotini
Beetles described in 1775
Monotypic Cerambycidae genera